The KB-P 790 (Дегтярёва Гаранина инд. КБ-П-790) is a light machine gun prototype of Soviet origin. The weapon uses a delayed blowback operation and is chambered in the 7.62×39mm round.

Also known as the Degtyarev-Garanin, it was one of the four competitors in the contest for replacing the RPD. Ultimately it lost to Kalashnikov's RPK.

References

 Сергей Монетчиков, РУССКИЕ ОРУЖЕЙНИКИ: Создатель единого пулемета, Bratishka issue of July–August 2003 (in Russian)
 Юрий Пономарёв "Битва трёх «К»", Kalashnikov magazine, 2010/6, pp. 76–85 (in Russian)

See also
Garanin machine guns
List of Russian weaponry

7.62×39mm machine guns
Light machine guns
Delayed blowback firearms
Trial and research firearms of the Soviet Union
Machine guns of the Soviet Union
KBP Instrument Design Bureau products